Erigeron reductus is a species of flowering plant in the family Asteraceae known by the common name lesser California rayless fleabane. It is endemic to California, from Trinity County south as far as Alameda County and El Dorado County.

Erigeron reductus grows in rocky habitats in several mountain ranges in the northern part of the state. It is a perennial herb producing several spreading to erect stems up to 30 centimeters (12 inches) long from a woody caudex and root system. Each stem is lined evenly with small, thready leaves and topped with an inflorescence of one or more flower heads. Each glandular flower head is up to a centimeter (0.4 inches) wide and contains many yellow disc florets but no ray florets. The fruit is an achene with a pappus of bristles.

Varieties
Erigeron reductus var. angustatus (A.Gray) G.L.Nesom - Coast Ranges from Trinity County to Alameda County
Erigeron reductus var. reductus - Trinity Mountains and Sierra Nevada from Trinity County to El Dorado County

The two varieties do intergrade in their region of overlap (Trinity County).

References

External links
Calflora Database: Erigeron reductus (Lesser california rayless fleabane, Rayless daisy)
Jepson Manual eFlora (TJM2) treatment of Erigeron reductus
United States Department of Agriculture Plants Profile
UC Calphotos Photo gallery, University of California

reductus
Endemic flora of California
Flora of the Klamath Mountains
Flora of the Sierra Nevada (United States)
Natural history of the California chaparral and woodlands
Natural history of the California Coast Ranges
Natural history of the San Francisco Bay Area
~
Plants described in 1947
Flora without expected TNC conservation status
Taxa named by Arthur Cronquist